The Brown Derbies is an a cappella group at Brown University. They were founded by Darryl Shrock in 1982 and have released fourteen albums. They sing a variety of different genres, ranging from Rock, to Pop, to R&B and are known in the a cappella community for their unique use of syllables in the background vocals. They have toured throughout the United States and internationally, with recent performances in Beijing, China, Shanghai, China, and New Orleans, Louisiana. In 1997, the group performed for President Bill Clinton at the White House. In November 2007, they were featured on the CBS Early Show in a segment about the rising popularity of a cappella groups on college campuses, and in July 2011 they were featured on the Gospel Music Channel reality show America Sings.   In January 2012, they performed in the London A Cappella Festival.

The Derbies are known for incorporating humor and choreography into many of their live performances. An annual tradition is performing with the Chattertocks in their annual concert, "Smoked Salomon," which occurs every September in Salomon Hall on the Brown University campus. Their sister a cappella group is the Smith Smiffenpoofs.

Awards
The Derbies' fourth album, "Down Time," was first runner-up for Best Male Collegiate Album in the 1995 CARAs.  Their next album, "Nightcap," swept the CARAs, winning Best Male Collegiate Album (though tied with the Middlebury Dissipated Eight's "Eighps"), Best Male Collegiate Song ("In the House of Stone & Light"), Best Male Collegiate Arrangement ("Who Are You?" arr. Evan Schiff), and Best Male Collegiate Soloist (Joel Begleiter on "The Downeaster Alexa").  The Derbies kept their streak alive on their next album, "Jericho," which also placed in all four categories of the 2000 CARAs.  They tied in the category of Best Male Collegiate Album again, this time with the Tufts Beelzebubs' "Infinity."  They won Best Male Collegiate Song ("I Wanna Be Like You") and Best Male Collegiate Arrangement (Raj Patil) and received first runner-up for Best Male Collegiate Soloist (Marcos Santiago, who was competing in the five-person category with fellow Derby Keith Getchell).

The Derbies have also been recognized formally for their live performances by the ICCA.  In 1996, they were first runner-up in the New England Region in the Semifinals and also got runner-up for Best Arrangement ("Who Are You?" arr. Evan Schiff).  The same piece won Best Arrangement at the Quarterfinals the same year.  In 1997, they were crowned champions of the Northeast region at the ICCA Semifinals, where they also won Best Solo (Adam Arian, "Who Are You?").  They received the award for Best Arrangement ("In the House of Stone & Light," Raj Patil) earlier in the tournament at the Quarterfinals. In 2013, the group competed in the ICCA for the first time in over a decade, advancing to the semifinals.

The Brown Derbies have appeared on several collegiate a cappella compilation albums.  "In Your Eyes," from the Derby album "Down Time," was featured on the Best of College A Cappella: Volume 1.  "In the House of Stone & Light" was selected for the BOCA '97-'98 album and "Telephone Message" (Mentos Edition) made it on to "BOCA Humor: Wasting Our Parents' Money." Most recently, "Happier," from the Derby Album "To Be Determined," earned a spot on BOCA 2020.

Albums
 Derby Laundry (1986)
 Talk Derby to Me (1991)
 Hat Trick (1993)
 Down Time (1994)
 Nightcap (1997)
 Jericho (1999)
"This album ought to be required listening for any college group planning to record." - RARB Review
 Hybrid (2002)
"These guys are supremely musical — a real treat on a rock-intensive album." - RARB Review
 Recap (2004)
 We Deliver (2007)
 Ridin' Derby (2008)
 Nice Guys, Better Guests (2011)
 Derbyhaus (2014)
"Lovers in Rome" from Derbyhaus nominated for 2015 Contemporary A Cappella Recording Award (CARA) for Best Male Collegiate Arrangement
 Unaccounted For (2017)
To Be Determined (2019)
"Happier" from To Be Determined is featured on Best of College A Cappella (BOCA) 2020
Melvin's Room (2022)

Notable alumni
 Adam Farb, co-founder of the International Championship of Collegiate A Cappella
 Todd Goldstein, former guitarist of the Harlem Shakes and current guitarist/vocalist of ARMS.
 Davis Guggenheim, Oscar-winning director of An Inconvenient Truth.
 Kent Haines, stand-up comedian.
 Andrew Baum, Vice Chairman of Emergency Medicine 
Joel Begleiter, talent agent for CAA
Joasaph McLellan, Head of the Russian Ecclesiastical Mission in Jerusalem.
 Lance Rubin, actor and Upright Citizens Brigade Theatre performer.
 Adam Werbach, environmental activist.
 A. Gabriel Schifman, Director of Pediatric Emergency Medicine

References

External links 

 The Brown Derbies
 The Brown Derbies on Facebook
 The Brown Derbies on Spotify
 The Brown Derbies on Youtube
 @brownderbies Instagram

Brown University organizations
Musical groups from Rhode Island
Collegiate a cappella groups
Musical groups established in 1982
1982 establishments in Rhode Island